is a magical girl anime TV series produced by Ashi Productions and aired from 2 May 1990 to 27 March 1991 on TV Tokyo.

Plot
Mint is a young girl who also happens to be the princess of the world of dreams and magic. The natural environment of her world is only a reflection of the dreams of the people on Earth. It is now in danger as people lose faith in their dreams and let darkness enter their hearts; this is causing the environment of Mint's world to wither and die.

On her 12th birthday, after a gala celebration with her father the King and her mother Queen Lime, she agrees to go to the world of humans to try to preserve people's hopes and dreams, and to prove that she has the qualities necessary to be a wise ruler. However, when Mint discovers that all of the flowers of the rainbow garden are blue (the color of sadness), she knows her task will not be an easy one.

Mint's father arranges for her to stay with his sister, Mint's Aunt Herb, who runs a gift shop on Earth called "Happy Shop". Mint is also allowed to choose two best friends who will share the secret of her true identity. She chooses a young boy named Plum and a young girl named Nut, because when she arrives on Earth, she realizes her father forgot to give her her aunt's address, and they help her find the shop. Her pet parrot Waffle goes with her as her mascot and to try to keep her out of trouble.

Characters

Mint is a 12-year-old princess from Fairy Land attending school in the human world. She has a kind heart and a gentle personality. Her accessories include the Mint Stick (her magic wand), Mint Compact (which is attached to her arm that turns into her wand and arrow), Mint Arrow (which changes her clothes just like Minky Momo), Star Accessory Earrings, and Star Necklace. Her incantation is "Parieru Remurin Sweet Mint". Mint has an insatiable appetite, and can often be seen eating hamburgers and fries about anytime during the day, even in the morning.

Waffle

Waffle is Mint's pint-sized flying pet penguin.

Mint's friend who is 14 years old. Nuts loves to read and is very family-oriented. She can transform using a magical synthesizer brooch.

Plum

One of Mint's friends, Plum has extreme vertigo, is a bit of a flirt. He is a quick thinker and helped Mint get out of some trouble with the police. He has a magical pendant.

External links
  Starchild DVD release page
 
 

1990 anime television series debuts
Magical girl anime and manga
Anime with original screenplays
Ashi Productions
TV Tokyo original programming